Senator Finley may refer to:

David E. Finley (1861–1917), South Carolina State Senate
Hugh F. Finley (1833–1909), Kentucky State Senate
Jesse J. Finley (1812–1904), Arkansas State Senate and Florida State Senate
Morgan M. Finley (1925–2016), Illinois State Senate

See also
Senator Finney (disambiguation)